John Walter Lambeth (January 10, 1896 – January 12, 1961) was a U.S. Representative from North Carolina.

Born in Thomasville, North Carolina, Lambeth attended local public schools.
He graduated from Trinity College (now Duke University), Durham, North Carolina, in 1916, and later attended Harvard. He joined the Army on January 15, 1918, and saw service in Europe during the remainder of the First World War. He was discharged with the rank of sergeant on July 26, 1919.

Lambeth worked in furniture manufacturing between 1919 and 1930, was elected to the North Carolina State Senate in 1921, and was mayor of Thomasville from 1925 to 1929. He was elected as a Democrat to the Seventy-second Congress in 1930 and was re-elected three times before declining nomination in 1938.

He died in Washington, D.C. on January 12, 1961, and is interred in the City Cemetery in Thomasville.

Sources

1896 births
1961 deaths
Duke University Trinity College of Arts and Sciences alumni
Harvard University alumni
United States Army soldiers
Democratic Party North Carolina state senators
People from Thomasville, North Carolina
Mayors of places in North Carolina
Democratic Party members of the United States House of Representatives from North Carolina
20th-century American politicians